Osvald Polívka (24 May 1859 in Enns – 30 April 1931 in Prague) was an Austrian-born Czech architect associated with the Art Nouveau period in Prague. Polívka designed many of Prague's significant landmarks of the era, plus other work in Brno and elsewhere.

After graduating from Czech Polytechnic in Prague, his first important commission was a collaboration with Antonín Wiehl, the 1894 Prague City Savings Bank. Polívka's style evolved through his active years but he remained devoted to the collaborating with artists for aesthetic effect. For the ornate landmark Municipal House he coordinated the work of many significant Czech muralists and sculptors of the time, including his friend Alfons Mucha.

He is buried at Olšany Cemetery in Prague.

Major architectural projects 
 Prague City Savings Bank, Old Town Square, together with Antonín Wiehl, 1894, with distinctive architectural sculptural groups by Bohuslav Schnirch
 Zemská Banka head office, Na příkopě, 1895-1896
 Assicurazioni Generali offices, now the Viola Building, with Friedrich Ohmann, #7 Wenceslas Square, 1897
 U Nováků department store, 1902–1903
 Topič House, circa 1905
 the New Town Hall of Prague, 1908–1911, with architectural sculpture by Stanislav Sucharda, Josef Mařatka and Ladislav Šaloun
 Gallery of Modern Art in Hradec Králové, 1912, with allegorical sculpture by Šaloun flanking the entrance

References

External links 

Osvald Polívka at the archiweb.cz 
Moravská galerie 

1859 births
1931 deaths
Czech architects
Art Nouveau architects
People from Linz-Land District
Burials at Olšany Cemetery